Noorul Riaz (born 9 December 1979) is an Indian-born cricketer who plays for the Oman national cricket team. He played in the 2016 ICC World Cricket League Division Five tournament.

References

External links
 

1979 births
Living people
Omani cricketers
Indian emigrants to Oman
Indian expatriates in Oman
Sportspeople from Madurai
Cricketers from Tamil Nadu